Miguel Angel Olaverri Arroniz (born 9 May 1948 in Pamplona, Spain) is a Spanish prelate and Roman Catholic Archbishop of Pointe-Noire in the Republic of the Congo.

Life 
Arroniz joined the Order of the Salesians of Don Bosco and was ordained a priest on 5 May 1976.

He was appointed Bishop of Pointe-Noire on 22 February 2013 by Pope Benedict XVI and ordained on 28 April 2013 by the Bishop of Bayeux, Pierre Pican, assisted by the Bishop of Kinkala, Louis Portella, and Archbishop Jan Romeo Pawlowski.

He became the first Archbishop of Pointe-Noire on 30 May 2020, when Pointe-Noire was elevated to an archdiocese.

References 

Roman Catholic archbishops of Pointe-Noire
1948 births
Roman Catholic bishops of Pointe-Noire
Living people